Ruellia simplex, the Mexican petunia, Mexican bluebell or Britton's wild petunia, is a species of flowering plant in the family Acanthaceae. It is a native of Mexico, the Caribbean, and South America. It has become a widespread invasive plant in Florida, where it was likely introduced as an ornamental before 1933, as well as in the eastern Mediterranean, South Asia and other parts of the eastern hemisphere.

Taxonomy and synonyms
Ruellia simplex C.Wright is the oldest and accepted name for this species, which has been variously called Ruellia angustifolia (Nees) Lindau, Ruellia brittoniana Leonard, and Cryphiacanthus angustifolius Nees, among several synonyms. The genus is named after French botanist Jean Ruel, while the specific name refers to the simple, not compound leaves.

Description

Distribution
Ruellia simplex is native to Mexico, the West Indies, western Bolivia, southwestern Brazil, Paraguay, Uruguay, and northeastern Argentina. It has been widely used as an ornamental plant and has escaped from cultivation in the United States, Australia and parts of Asia, as well as several Pacific Islands. It has become invasive in some of these areas, forming dense, single-species stands of vegetation which threaten native plants. It is mainly a plant of wet places such as ditches, pond verges, lakesides and marshes, but can survive in drier conditions.

Control
The University of Florida's Institute of Food and Agricultural Sciences is trying to reduce the number of home gardeners who plant R. simplex by recommending alternatives, especially Silphium asteriscus, Sisyrinchium angustifolium, Stachytarpheta jamaicensis, Stokesia laevis, but also including some R. simplex cultivars that are sterile.

References

External links

 Ruellia simplex in Florida. Atlas of Florida Vascular Plants.
 IPNI Listing

simplex
Plants described in 1870